Ranger is an unincorporated community in Anderson Township, Perry County, in the U.S. state of Indiana.

History
A post office was established at Ranger in 1866, and remained in operation until it was discontinued in 1952. On April 3, 1974, Ranger was directly struck by an F5 tornado. The tornado heavily damaged the town, and was the first of seven F5 tornadoes to touch down that day, being a part of the 1974 Super Outbreak.

Geography

References

Unincorporated communities in Perry County, Indiana
Unincorporated communities in Indiana